The Cronut is a pastry. It resembles a doughnut and is made from croissant-like dough filled with flavored cream and fried in grapeseed oil. The Cronut was created and trademarked in 2013 by the French pastry chef Dominique Ansel.

Etymology
Cronut is a portmanteau of (cro)issant and do(nut).

Origin

In 2013, the French bakery owner Dominique Ansel created the pastry out of dough similar to that of a croissant (a pastry that he had been more familiar with) with flavored cream inside. It took Ansel two months to perfect the recipe.

Ansel introduced the Cronut on May 10, 2013, at Dominique Ansel Bakery in New York's SoHo neighborhood. That night, a blogger from Grub Street, the online restaurant blog from New York, reported on the new pastry. The post resulted in much interest and online circulation, and by the third day, a line of over 100 people had formed outside the shop to buy it.

Within nine days of introducing the pastry, Ansel filed for a trademark for the name "Cronut" at the United States Patent and Trademark Office, which was approved.

Similar products

After the release of the Cronut, similar products have sprung up throughout the world including some with different names such as the Kelownut, Doughssant, Crullant, zonut, and others.

Dominique Ansel released an at-home Cronut recipe in his cookbook, Dominique Ansel: The Secret Recipes, in 2015, for bakers to attempt in their own homes. Like the original pastry made at Ansel's bakeries, the process takes three days.

Reception
Writing for the Village Voice in May 2013, Tejal Rao proclaimed the Cronut Ansel's "masterpiece". Time named the Cronut one of the best "extremely fun" inventions of 2013.

See also

 Cruffin
 Cruller
 List of doughnut varieties
 List of fried dough varieties 
 List of pastries
 List of regional dishes of the United States
 Wonut

References

External links

Maine bakery told to stop selling Crauxnuts

Food and drink introduced in 2013
Pastries
Cuisine of New York City
American doughnuts